Florian David (born 16 November 1992) is a Guadeloupean professional footballer who plays as a forward for Lithuanian club Kauno Žalgiris and the Guadeloupe national team.

Club career
On 14 December 2020, David rejoined Rodez on a permanent deal until the end of the season after terminating his contract with Chambly early.

On 31 January 2023, David joined A Lyga club Kauno Žalgiris.

Career statistics

Club

Notes

International 

Scores and results list Guadeloupe's goal tally first, score column indicates score after each David goal.

References

External links
 Florian David at Caribbean Football Database

1992 births
Living people
People from Champigny-sur-Marne
French people of Guadeloupean descent
Guadeloupean footballers
Footballers from Val-de-Marne
Association football forwards
Guadeloupe international footballers
French footballers
Toulouse FC players
Grenoble Foot 38 players
Les Herbiers VF players
Rodez AF players
FC Chambly Oise players
FK Kauno Žalgiris players
French expatriate footballers
Expatriate footballers in Lithuania
French expatriate sportspeople in Lithuania